The S500 was the second production car from Honda (and its first passenger automobile), released in 1963, following the T360 truck into production by four months. It was a larger-displacement variant of the S360 roadster which, though developed for sale in 1962, was never produced.

Design 

Like the S360, the S500 used a high-tech engine developed from Honda's motorcycle expertise. It was a dual overhead cam straight-4 with four Keihin carburetors and a 9500 rpm redline.  Originally intended to displace 492 cc, the production version was 531 cc and produced  at 8000 rpm. At the time of its introduction, its dimensions and engine displacement were larger than established kei car regulations.

The S500 used a four-speed manual transmission. A four-wheel independent suspension was also novel, with torsion bars at the front and chain-driven, coilover-sprung trailing arms at the rear.

The car was priced at $1,275 in 1963. An optional fiberglass hardtop was also available. 1,363 S500s were produced from October 1963 through September 1964.

The S500 saw competitors during its introduction, such as the Datsun Fairlady, the Toyota Sports 800, and the Daihatsu Compagno.

References

Notes

External links

Motor Trend History of S600

S500
Cars introduced in 1963
Cars discontinued in 1964
Roadsters